Robert Allison may refer to:

 Robert Allison (pirate) (fl. 1679–1699), buccaneer and privateer
 Bob Allison (1934–1995), professional baseball player
 Bobby Allison (born 1937), American NASCAR driver
 Bobby Allison (footballer) (1895–1948), Australian rules footballer for South Melbourne
 Robert Allison (Pennsylvania politician) (1777–1840), United States Representative from Pennsylvania
 Robert Allison (South Dakota politician) (1846–1924), South Dakota State Representative
 Robert Clay Allison (1841–1887), gunfighter and figure of the American Old West
 Robert Galbraith Allison (1897–1952), American accountant and state auditor
 Robert Allison (academic) (born 1961), British academic and current Vice-Chancellor and President of Loughborough University
 Robert Andrew Allison (1838–1926), English Liberal politician
 Robert H. Allison (1893–1959), American politician and lawyer